Williton was a rural district in Somerset, England, from 1894 to 1974.

It was created in 1894 under the Local Government Act 1894.

In 1974 it was abolished under the Local Government Act 1972 when it became part of West Somerset.

The parishes which made up the Rural District included Bicknoller, Brompton Ralph, Carhampton, Clatworthy, Crowcombe, Cutcombe, Dunster, East Quantoxhead, Elworthy, Holford, Kilve, Luccombe, Luxborough, Minehead, Minehead Without, Monksilver, Nettlecombe, Oare, Old Cleeve, Porlock, Sampford Brett, Selworthy, Stogumber, Stogursey, Stringston, Timberscombe, Treborough, West Quantoxhead, Williton, Withycombe and Wootton Courtenay.

References

Williton Rural District at Britain Through Time
Local Government Act 1972

Districts of England created by the Local Government Act 1894
Districts of England abolished by the Local Government Act 1972
History of Somerset
Local government in Somerset
Rural districts of England